Radeberger Group is the largest brewery group in Germany. It is headquartered in Frankfurt am Main and produces beer (as well as near beer and other non-alcoholic beverages) at 16 different locations. With an approximate annual production volume of 13 million hectolitres, the group accounts for approximately 15% of German beer production.

History
Dr. Oetker purchased Frankfurt-based Binding Brewery in 1952, which became Binding-Gruppe, the brewery and non-alcoholic beverage division. After the acquisition of Radeberger Brewery, the division was renamed Radeberger Gruppe in 2002.

Subsidiaries
 Allgäuer Brauhaus AG
 Brands: Allgäuer, Altenmünster, Büble, Oberdorfer, Teutsch Pils, Fürstabt, Norbertus
 Berliner-Kindl-Schultheiss-Brauerei, Berlin
 Brands: Berliner Kindl, Schultheiss, Berliner Pilsner, Potsdamer Rex, Berliner Bürgerbräu, Märkischer Landmann, Prater
 Binding Brewery, Frankfurt am Main
 Brands: Binding, Henninger, Erbacher
 Bionade GmbH, Ostheim vor der Rhön
 Dortmunder Actien Brauerei, Dortmund
 Brands: Kronen, Union, DAB, Brinkhoff's, Hansa, Hövels, Ritter, Thier, Stifts, Wicküler, Andreas Pils, Schlösser Alt
 Freiberger Brauhaus GmbH, Freiberg
 Brands: Freiberger, Freibergisch, Meisterbräu
 Friesisches Brauhaus zu Jever, Jever
 Hanseatische Brauerei Rostock, Rostock
 Brands: Rostocker, Mahn & Ohlerich
 Haus Kölscher Brautradition, Cologne
 Brands: Gilden Kölsch, Küppers Kölsch, Kurfürsten Kölsch (until 2011), Sester Kölsch, Sion Kölsch, Peters Kölsch, Dom Kölsch since October 2013
 Krostitzer Brauerei, Krostitz
 Brands: Ur-Krostitzer
 Sternburg-Brauerei, Leipzig
 Radeberger Exportbierbrauerei GmbH, Radeberg
 Brauerei Schlösser, Düsseldorf
 Brands: Schlösser Alt  (brewed in Dortmund since 2002)
 Stuttgarter Hofbräu AG & Co. KG, Stuttgart
 Brands: Stuttgarter Hofbräu, Malteser Weissbier
 Tucher Bräu GmbH & Co. KG, Nürnberg/Fürth
 Brands: Tucher, Lederer Bräu, Zirndorfer, Grüner, Humbser, Patrizier, Kloster Scheyern

References

External links
 

Beer in Germany
Dr. Oetker
Manufacturing companies based in Frankfurt